Erin's Own is a Gaelic Athletic Association club based in Bagenalstown, County Carlow. The club, founded in 1934 but reorganised following a merger with Bagenalstown in the 1960s, was primarily concerned with the game of hurling. In 2019, the club amalgamated with St. Andrews and Muinebheag CLG to form Bagenalstown Gaels.

History

Erin's Own GAA Club was founded in 1934 in the boy's local national school by Michael Gaynor, Brother Hillary, Michael Purcell, Jack Monaghan, Joe Holden and Ned Keegan. The club has won numerous club championship titles in all grades, including minor, under-21, premier junior, junior, intermediate and senior. In 2005 the club became the first from Carlow to claim a Leinster club title in any grade.

Honours

 Carlow Senior Hurling Championship (3): 1964, 1967, 1970
 Leinster Junior Club Hurling Championship (1): 2005
 All-Ireland Junior Club Hurling Championship Runners-Up 2006

Notable players

 Craig Doyle (hurler)
 Brian Doyle
 Jim English
 Mark Mullins

References

Gaelic games clubs in County Carlow
Hurling clubs in County Carlow